James E. Craig (born 1956) is an American law enforcement official who served as the chief of the Detroit Police Department. He served in this capacity from 2013 to 2021, after previously serving as chief of the Cincinnati Police Department and Portland Police Department. He also served as deputy mayor of Detroit.

Early life 
Craig was born and raised in Detroit, Michigan. His father was a veteran of the U.S. Army and served as a reserve police officer at the time of the 1967 Detroit riot, when James Craig was in fifth grade. He graduated from Cass Technical High School and joined the Detroit Police Department in 1977.

Policing career 
Craig first worked at the Detroit Police Department from 1977 until he was laid off in 1981. He went to Los Angeles to work for the LAPD for nearly three decades. From 2009 to 2011, he was police chief for the Portland Police Department in Portland, Maine. From 2011 to 2013, he was chief of police for the Cincinnati Police Department in Cincinnati, Ohio. During his tenure with the Cincinnati police, the crime rate was its lowest since 2000, though it was part of an overall trend of decreasing crime.

Chief of the Detroit Police Department 
After he had initially worked with the Detroit Police Department earlier in his career, Craig had said he wouldn't go back to work for them unless he was offered the role of police chief. He was originally appointed police chief by Detroit emergency manager Kevyn Orr. He replaced Chester Logan, who had held the position on an interim basis since the previous October when his predecessor, Ralph Godbee, was fired for having sexual relations with a subordinate. Craig officially took office on July 1, 2013.

In his first year as chief, homicide cases made a modest drop from 332 to 300 between the years 2013 and 2014. In early 2014, Craig made national headlines for saying more armed citizens would decrease the crime rate. Craig claimed in 2017 that crime was steadily decreasing since his taking office in 2013, with data from a new software system employed by Detroit showing a 5 percent decrease in violent crime in 2016. The Federal Bureau of Investigation disputed his claim, and suggested violent crime had actually increased 15.7 percent between 2015 and 2016. Craig rejected their assessment. Detroit reported a 19 percent increase in homicide cases in 2020, with non-deadly shootings up 53 percent, though this was part of a trend of increasing crime nationwide, with homicide cases also rising above 50 percent in cities such as Boston and Chicago. In Craig's last five months as police chief (January 1-May 31, 2021), homicides in Detroit were up 27% and non-fatal shootings increased 44%. Craig blamed the COVID-19 pandemic for the uptick in crime. 

In 2020, Craig criticized the Drug Enforcement Agency and the Bureau of Alcohol, Tobacco, Firearms and Explosives,Tresa Baldas, Detroit Police Chief James Craig blasts feds over serial killings: 'Own it', Detroit Free Press (March 3, 2022). alleging that the two federal agencies had used Kenyel Brown as an informant. Craig pulled Detroit police officers out of a longstanding DEA-Detroit PDF task force. Craig also clashed with local judges and the Wayne County Prosecutor's Office, viewing bonds set for defendants as too low, and plea agreements and sentences too lenient.George Hunter, Craig, Worthy spar over violent criminal plea deals, Detroit News (August 29, 2020).  County Prosecutor Kym Worthy responded by suggesting that the police department's investigations were often inadequate, and upon Craig's departure as chief suggested that Craig was a "glory seeker."

At times, Craig made headlines by describing people involved in mass shootings in the city as "urban terrorists". In December 2015, Craig said that terrorists are unlikely to attack Detroit because so many residents have concealed carry permits.

In January 2016, Detroit Mayor Mike Duggan designated Craig as the city's deputy mayor. In 2022, Duggan criticized Craig's record as police chief, noting that violent crime in Detroit did not decline until after the appointment, in June 2021, of James White as Craig's successor.

As police chief, Craig initiated Project Green Light to provide police live stream of videos to businesses to better respond to crimes there. He has also initiated programs to cut gang membership and large scale sweeps aimed at finding people with outstanding warrants. In August 2019, Craig defended the police use of facial recognition software after the use of the technology was criticized by Congresswoman Rashida Tlaib. The Detroit Board of Police Commissioners ruled for the facial recognition policies to be limited to still images of suspects in criminal investigations, which Craig welcomed and heralded.

2022 Michigan gubernatorial election
In May 2021, it was reported Craig would be announcing his retirement from the Detroit police. He had previously met with Arizona Governor Doug Ducey, chair of the Republican Governors Association, and other Republican officials in talks about a potential run for governor of Michigan in 2022 against Democratic incumbent Gretchen Whitmer. On June 1, 2021, Craig retired after 44 years of service in law enforcement. He announced his campaign on a July 2021 appearance on Tucker Carlson Tonight.

On September 14, 2021, Craig attempted to announce his bid for Governor on Belle Isle, but was unable to be heard due to the presence of protestors who surrounded him on the podium, chanting "No justice, no peace, James Craig is still police." He later made his official announcement atop a former General Motors building in Detroit. During his gubernatorial campaign, Craig sought the endorsement of Donald Trump, and refused to express any view on Trump's claim that the 2020 presidential election was "stolen" from him.

In May 2022, amid questions over the legitimacy of some signatures on his nominating petitions, Craig acknowledged possible fraud by signature gatherers. State election officials ruled that Craig, alongside four other Republican primary candidates, had failed to submit enough valid signatures to appear on the ballot, thus rendering him ineligible to compete for the party nomination. Craig filed a lawsuit in a bid to get on the primary ballot, but the suit was rejected by the Michigan Court of Claims.Arpan Lobo & Clara Hendrickson, James Craig loses bid to appear on primary ballot after Michigan court denies appeal, Detroit Free Press (June 2, 2022). Craig then launched a write-in campaign for the Republican primary nomination.Paul Egan, Former Detroit Police Chief James Craig to launch write-in campaign for Michigan governor, Detroit Free Press (June 10, 2022).

Personal life 
Craig has one son and daughter and has been married 4 times to 3 different women.  His son, OVO James Craig is a hip-hop artist and he is only close with his daughter. According to court records, while a ranking officer in Los Angeles, Craig has filed twice for personal bankruptcy.

In March 2020, Craig tested positive for COVID-19 during the 2020 coronavirus pandemic in Michigan.

References

External links

Sources
mlive article on Craig
May 21, 2015 Detroit Free Press

1956 births
20th-century African-American people
21st-century African-American people
African-American police officers
Candidates in the 2022 United States elections
Cass Technical High School alumni
Detroit Police Department chiefs
Living people
Michigan Republicans
People from Detroit